The Council elections held in Wolverhampton on Thursday 4 May 1995 were one third, and 20 of the 60 seats were up for election.

During the 1995 election the Merry Hill ward had two seats contested due to a vacancy arising.

Prior to the election the constitution of the Council was:

Labour 33
Conservative 25
Liberal Democrats 3

Following the election the constitution of the Council was:

Labour 39
Conservative 19
Liberal Democrats 2

Election result

1995
1995 English local elections
1990s in the West Midlands (county)